Serena Williams and Venus Williams were the defending champions, but they withdrew due to injuries.
No. 5 seeds Victoria Azarenka and Maria Kirilenko won the tournament by defeating the No. 2 seeds Květa Peschke and Katarina Srebotnik 6–4, 6–3 in the final.

Seeds
The top four seeds receive a bye into the second round.

Draw

Finals

Top half

Bottom half

References
 Main Draw

Women's Doubles